Edgar Gilmer Dawson (March 6, 1830 – April 24, 1883) was a planter and lawyer.  He was born in Greensboro, Georgia, and was one of the Greene County Dawsons, the fifth child of Senator William Crosby Dawson.

In 1849 he received an A.B. from the University of Georgia and he married Lucy F. Terrell, daughter of Dr. William Terrell of Sparta, Georgia, in 1856.

Dawson served as Captain and later Major of the Terrell Light Artillery from 1861 to 1864 during the Civil War.  After 1867, he became a resident of Baltimore, Maryland.

The Edgar Gilmer Dawson Fund supports agricultural education at the University of Georgia.  Dawson Hall, which houses the College of Family and Consumer Sciences, was named for him.

References
UGA Centennial Catalog
UGA donors
A collection of family records, with biographical sketches and other memoranda of various families and individuals bearing the name Dawson, or allied to families of that name. Comp. by Charles C. Dawson, pp 371-372.  Albany, N.Y.:  J. Munsell, 1874.

1830 births
1883 deaths
University of Georgia alumni
Confederate States Army officers
People of Georgia (U.S. state) in the American Civil War
Georgia (U.S. state) lawyers
People from Greensboro, Georgia
American planters
19th-century American lawyers